Elijah Alfred Alexander III (August 2, 1970 – March 24, 2010) was a linebacker who played ten seasons in the NFL for the Tampa Bay Buccaneers, Denver Broncos, Indianapolis Colts and Oakland Raiders. In 2005 Alexander was diagnosed with multiple myeloma. In 2006, he founded the Tackle Myeloma Foundation, which raised funds to help find a cure and raise awareness about myeloma (since then shut down by his surviving wife).

Early life
Alexander attended Dunbar High School in Fort Worth, Texas. He played college football for Kansas State University. In his freshman season, the team finished with an 0-11 win–loss record. When he was a senior, the 1988 team won seven games, the school's most victories in a season since 1954. He registered 234 career tackles at Kansas State and appeared in the Senior Bowl in 1991.

NFL career
The Tampa Bay Buccaneers selected Alexander in the tenth round of the 1992 NFL Draft. He appeared in 12 games for the team that season. In 1993, the Denver Broncos claimed Alexander off of waivers from Tampa Bay. Alexander did not start in 1993, but he appeared in 16 games.

In 1994, Alexander started all 16 games and he registered a career-high 88 tackles and 24 assists. He played in only nine games in 1995 due to a shoulder injury. The next year with the Indianapolis Colts, he struggled with a hamstring injury at the beginning of the season but appeared in 14 games. In 1997, Alexander played in 13 games, starting eleven of them, and he collected 52 tackles. He spent two more seasons with the Colts, collecting 52 and 51 tackles, respectively. In his last two seasons, 2000 and 2001, Alexander started 29 games for the Oakland Raiders and registered a total of 90 tackles for the team.

Illness and death
Alexander was diagnosed with multiple myeloma, a bone marrow cancer, in 2005. He had few symptoms, except for persistent pain in his feet, before his diagnosis. The disease was discovered after Alexander had bloodwork in Costa Rica while on a golfing vacation. He underwent chemotherapy and a bone marrow transplant. At one point, he lost nearly 60 pounds. He died at Medical City Hospital in Dallas on March 24, 2010.

References

1970 births
2010 deaths
Sportspeople from Fort Worth, Texas
American football linebackers
Deaths from cancer in Texas
Deaths from multiple myeloma
Denver Broncos players
Indianapolis Colts players
Kansas State Wildcats football players
Oakland Raiders players
Tampa Bay Buccaneers players